Békéscsabai Benny Bulls RC is a Hungarian rugby club in Békéscsaba. They currently play in Hungarian National Championship I.

History
The club was founded in 1992.

Current squad

External links
  Békéscsabai Benny Bulls RC

Hungarian rugby union teams
Rugby clubs established in 1992
Békéscsaba
1992 establishments in Hungary